Euclea natalensis, the Natal guarri, is a dioecious African plant species of the family Ebenaceae. It occurs from Ethiopia and Somalia in the north, southwards to the Western Cape, South Africa. It has nectar and also contains pollen Its hirsute, leathery leaves have an opposite arrangement, and the flower sprays grow from the leaf axils. The spherical fruit appear from October to June.

Races
The three races are:
 Euclea natalensis subsp. natalensis
 Euclea natalensis subsp. angolensis F.White
 Euclea natalensis subsp. obovata F.White

References

Trees of Africa
natalensis
Dioecious plants